Angel Falls is a waterfall in Venezuela and the highest in the world.

Angel Falls may also refer to:

Other waterfalls
 Angel Falls (Georgia), US
 Angel Falls (Maine), US

Arts, entertainment, and media
 Angel Falls (TV series), an American television series that aired in 1993
 Angel Falls, the fictional setting of The Guardians of Time trilogy
 Delta Force: Angel Falls, a never-released video game announced in 2008

See also
 Angels Fall (disambiguation)